David John 'Truckie' Parsons (born 1955) is a former racing driver from Castlemaine in Victoria, Australia. He raced his own car in selected races of the 1995, 1996 and 1997 seasons of the Australian Touring Car Championship, as well as Bathurst 1000 and other races for his own and other teams. In 1999, the two David Parsons teamed up together in a Gibson Motorsport Commodore for the 1999 FAI 1000.

References

1955 births
Living people
Racing drivers from Victoria (Australia)
Australian Touring Car Championship drivers